Zakariya Khan (died 1745), alternatively spelt as Zakaria Khan, was the Mughal Empire's subahdar of Lahore Subah from 1726, succeeding his father, Abd al-Samad Khan, in the post. He was descended from the Ansari family of Panipat. He continued and extended his father's policy of severe persecution of Sikhs, and thousands of Sikhs were killed during his period in the post, especially during the Chhota Ghallughara.

Khan was given control of Lahore by Persian Emperor Nader Shah during his invasion of the Mughal Empire in 1738 in return for annual tribute payments to the Persian crown. He continued the prosecution of Sikhs and appointed Salabat Khan to block Amritsar and not allowing Sikhs to worship there. According to prominent early Sikh historian Ratan Singh Bhangu, in response to having his scalp torn off, Taru Singh cursed Zakaria Khan, saying he would be killed by his shoes. According to Sikh sources, after cutting Bhai Taru Singh's scalp, Zakaria Khan was stricken with unbearable pain and the inability to urinate. As a last resort, Khan sent an apology to the Khalsa Panth for his persecution of Sikhs and begged for forgiveness. It was suggested that if Khan hit himself with Singh's shoes, his condition might be lifted. Although it would cure Khan of his condition, he died 22 days later from having hit himself with the shoes, just as Singh predicted. Salabat Khan was killed in an encounter with Jassa Singh Ahluwalia and Sikhs liberated Amritsar in March 1748.

In popular culture
 Zakariya Khan is portrayed by Shaikh Sami in the DD National series Maharaja Ranjit Singh

See also
Farrukhsiyar
Massa Ranghar
Jaspat Rai

References

18th-century viceregal rulers
1745 deaths